Gianni Carabelli (born 30 May 1979) is an Italian former athlete who specialized in the 400 metres hurdles.

Biography
He was a semi-finalist at the 2005 World Championships and finished 6th in the 400 m hurdles final at the 2006 European Athletics Championships in Gothenburg.

He graduated from high school in 1998 while he has a degree in computer science.

Achievements

See also
Italian all-time top lists – 400 metres hurdles

References

External links
 
 

1979 births
Italian male hurdlers
Living people
World Athletics Championships athletes for Italy
Mediterranean Games gold medalists for Italy
Athletes (track and field) at the 2005 Mediterranean Games
Mediterranean Games medalists in athletics
Athletics competitors of Centro Sportivo Carabinieri